Hohoe is one of the constituencies represented in the Parliament of Ghana. It elects one Member of Parliament (MP) by the first past the post system of election. Hohoe is located in the Hohoe Municipal district of the Volta Region of Ghana.

Boundaries
The constituency is located within the Hohoe Municipality in the Volta Region of Ghana.

Members of Parliament

Elections

 

 
 
 
 
 
 
 

 

 
 
 
 
 
 

The Electoral Commission of Ghana changed constituency configurations prior to the 2008 elections with Hohoe North constituency changed and what was left of Hohoe South becoming Hohoe constituency.

See also
List of Ghana Parliament constituencies

References 

Adam Carr's Election Archives
Ghana Home Page

Parliamentary constituencies in the Volta Region